The 2018 WSF Championship was an amateur snooker tournament that took place from 18 March to 24 March 2018 in Qawra, Malta. It was the first edition of the WSF Championships and also doubled as a qualification event for the World Snooker Tour. The best four players (all semi-finalists) received an invitation to compete in the 2018 World Snooker Championship. Two best players (both finalists) received a Main Tour Card for the 2018/2019 season.

The tournament was televised in Malta by TVM2.

Prize fund 
The breakdown of the tournament prizes is shown below:
 Winner: €10,000
 Runner-up: €4,000
 Semi-finalist: €1,800
 Quarter-finalist: €1,000
 Last 16: €400
 Last 32: €200
 Highest break: €300
 Total: €28,300

Results

Group A 
The following is the results from the Groups.

Group B

Group C

Group D

Group E

Group F

Group G

Group H

Group I

Group J

Group K

Group L

Group M

Group N

Group O

Group P

Group Q

Group R

Knockout stage 
The following is the results from the Knockout stage.

Round 1 
Best of 7 frames

Other rounds

Century breaks 
Total: 10

 131, 125, 107  Igor Figueiredo	
 130, 124, 119, 101, 100  Kristján Helgason
 127  Luo Honghao
 103  Adam Stefanow

References 

2018 in snooker
Snooker amateur tournaments
2018 in Maltese sport
International sports competitions hosted by Malta
WSF Championship
Snooker in Malta